Setsuo Yokomichi (January 2, 1911 – June 14, 1967) was a Japanese politician. He was the father of Takahiro Yokomichi, Governor of Hokkaido from 1983 to 1995.

1911 births
1967 deaths
Japanese politicians
People from Hokkaido